Mr. Burns, a Post-Electric Play (stylized Mr. Burns, a post-electric play) is an American black comedy play written by Anne Washburn and featuring music by Michael Friedman. Mr. Burns tells the story of a group of survivors recalling and retelling "Cape Feare", an episode of the TV show The Simpsons, shortly after a global catastrophe. It then examines the way the story has changed seven years after that, and finally, 75 years later.

It premiered in May 2012 at the Woolly Mammoth Theatre Company in Washington, D.C., and then ran from August through October 2013 at Playwrights Horizons in New York City, commissioned and developed with the New York theater company The Civilians.  It received polarized reviews and was nominated for a 2014 Drama League Award for Outstanding Production of a Broadway or Off-Broadway Play.

It was produced at the Almeida Theatre in London in 2014, and in Adelaide and Sydney, Australia, in 2017.

Plot
In the first act, shortly after an unspecified apocalyptic event, six survivors gather around a campfire. To distract themselves from mourning, they attempt to recount the episode "Cape Feare" of the television show The Simpsons, as well as various other pieces of pop culture.

The second act is set seven years later. The survivor group (plus a new member) have formed a travelling theatrical troupe that specializes in performing Simpsons episodes. Live theatre is a major entertainment form in the new society. Troupes fiercely compete to reconstruct and perform pre-apocalyptic stories. During a rehearsal of Cape Feare, the group is attacked by armed robbers, with their fates unknown.

The final act is set 75 years after the second act. Cape Feare, now a familiar myth, is being performed as a musical. The story, characters and morals have changed into more serious and epic forms. For example, Mr. Burns has been combined with Sideshow Bob (the actual Cape Feare villain) and is now a supernatural avatar of death and destruction.

In the musical's story, Burns destroys Springfield by sabotaging the nuclear power plant. The Simpsons flee from the catastrophe onto a houseboat. Burns, along with his demonic henchmen Itchy and Scratchy, sneaks onto the boat and unties the mooring ropes. Burns begins killing the Simpsons one by one. Bart, the last survivor, almost surrenders out of despair. However, he receives encouragement from the ghosts of his family and kills Burns in a swordfight. As Bart sings the finale song about hope for the future, the stage is lit up by bicycle-powered electric lights — the first appearance of electricity in the play.

History
Mr. Burns, a Post-Electric Play was written by Anne Washburn with a score composed by Michael Friedman. For a long time, Washburn had been exploring what it would be like "to take a TV show and push it past the apocalypse and see what happened to it" and while she originally considered Friends, Cheers, and M*A*S*H, she ultimately settled on The Simpsons.

Working with The Civilians theater company, who had commissioned the play, Washburn held a workshop for a week in a bank vault beneath Wall Street which was being used as a shared rehearsal space in 2008 to see how much of any episode of The Simpsons the actors she had assembled, including Matthew Maher, Maria Dizzia, and Jennifer R. Morris, could remember. Maher knew The Simpsons well and the group decided on the 1993 episode "Cape Feare", based on the 1991 film Cape Fear, itself a remake of an eponymous 1962 film which is based on the 1957 novel The Executioners. He helped Dizzia and Morris remember the episode, then the two of them went on to perform it for an audience without his help; Washburn subsequently utilized recordings of this process in writing her play's first act.

Productions

2012: Washington, D.C.
The play, a dark comedy, had its world premiere in May 2012 at Washington, D.C.'s Woolly Mammoth Theatre Company. It was commissioned by The Civilians and developed in partnership with them, Seattle Repertory Theatre, and Playwrights Horizons. It was directed by Steve Cosson who got confirmation from several lawyers that the play fell under the umbrella of fair use.

2013: New York City
Cosson also directed the New York City production at Playwrights Horizons that premiered on September 15, 2013. Maher and Morris, who had not appeared in the Woolly Mammoth production, returned for the New York staging. At Playwrights, the show ran until October 20, 2013. Samuel French, Inc. published the show's script and licenses productions of the show.

U.S. casts

2014: London
Washburn continued to revise the play for its European premiere at the Almeida Theatre in London in Spring 2014, and a new draft was published by Oberon Books. It was directed by Robert Icke, who commissioned Orlando Gough to compose a new a cappella score for the third act. The London production was visually and emotionally darker than the New York one, especially in its third act which resembled Greek tragedy as much as The Simpsons.

It provoked an extremely divided reaction from British critics, responses veering from one to five stars.

2017: Australia
A co-production between Sydney's Belvoir St Theatre and the State Theatre Company South Australia saw the play performed at Space Theatre in the Adelaide Festival Centre, Adelaide, in April–May 2017 and at the Belvoir in May–June 2017.

Mitchell Butel took the roles of Mr Burns and Gibson, while Paula Arundell,  Esther Hannaford, Jude Henshall, Brent Hill, Ezra Juanta, and Jacqy Phillips making up the rest of the cast. The production was directed by Imara Savage. The play was mostly met with good reviews and Butel won a Helpmann Award for his performance.

Reception
The New York Times ranked Mr. Burns: a post-electric play at #4 on its list "The Great Work Continues: The 25 Best American Plays Since Angels in America." Critic Laura Collins-Hughes wrote, "Not everyone loves this play; not everyone’s meant to. But for the rest of us, it’s the kind of bold, inventive show that sends you staggering out onto the street afterward, stunned and exhilarated, not sure quite what you’ve just experienced because you’ve never seen its like before."

In Time, Richard Zoglin characterized the reaction to the show as receiving "some rave reviews, a few equally passionate dissents and sellout crowds." Ben Brantley of The New York Times compared Mr. Burns to Giovanni Boccaccio's 14th-century book The Decameron in which a group of Italian youths have fled the Black Death to a villa where they begin to exchange stories. "At the end of Steve Cosson's vertiginous production, which opened on Sunday night at Playwrights Horizons, you’re likely to feel both exhausted and exhilarated from all the layers of time and thought you've traveled through", wrote Brantley. Reviewing for Vulture, Scott Brown found "Cape Feare" to be "a perfect palimpsest" and commended the ending musical number as "equal parts Brecht and Bart, Homer and the other Homer".

In his otherwise positive review, Brown noted that the play's "flabby middle act could use some tightening, to better dramatize Washburn’s talky deepthink." Marilyn Stasio wrote for Variety that the "piece loses sight of its humanity with an overproduced pop-rap-operetta in the underplotted second act". The Huffington Posts David Finkle felt that the play "could be contained in a 15-minute skit--if not quite a 140-character tweet" and that Washburn "stretches and stretches it through [its] three parts".

The play is referred to in the 2015 The Simpsons episode "Let's Go Fly a Coot" as part of a list of recent post-apocalyptic films (despite the fact that it is not a film). In writer Mike Reiss's memoir about writing for the show (Springfield Confidential), he describes his disappointment with the play, saying both it and the playwright failed because the play was what The Simpsons itself never was, "grim, pretentious and dull."

Awards

Analysis
Julie Grossman examined Mr. Burns as an instance of multilayered adaptation. She wrote that the show "challenges audiences to embrace the imaginative (if strange and alienating) scions, or adaptations, of cultural matter." In reference to characters in the play's second act bargaining for rights to and lines from other Simpsons episodes, she noted "That permissions and copyright have survived the apocalypse brings out the absurdity of owning the rights to artistic production and dialogue and the persistence of capitalism." Grossman differentiated Mr. Burns from Emily St. John Mandel's 2014 novel Station Eleven, which also examines storytelling in a postapocalyptic setting, in the types of catalysts for their respective apocalypse: a naturally occurring flu outbreak in Station Eleven versus an unnatural and greed-driven nuclear collapse in Mr. Burns. "Although the play's postmodern mash-up of television, film, and theater is highly entertaining, its powerful ethics resides in seeing capitalism and consumerism (symbolized by the greedy Simpsons character Mr. Burns) as the causes of civilization's decay."

References

Cited

External links
 
 Mr. Burns, a Post-Electric Play at Playwrights Horizons

2012 plays
Off-Broadway plays
Post-apocalyptic fiction
Plays based on television series
Works based on The Simpsons
Black comedy plays
Plays by Michael Friedman